Karen is a given name and occasional surname. In English, it is a feminine given name derived from the name Catherine, and it is also found in modern Africa, as well as in East Asia (particularly Japan). However, in other countries such as Iran and Armenia, it is a masculine name deriving from Middle Iranian.

English
Karen entered the English language from Danish, where it has been a short form of "Katherine" since medieval times. It became popular in the English-speaking world in the 1940s. The name Karen was one of the top 10 names for girls born in the United States during the 1950s and 1960s, peaking as the third most popular girl's name in 1965.

Variants include Caren, Caryn, Karena, Karin, Karyn, and others.

Due to its increasingly common derogatory use since 2017, the name has become significantly less popular in the United States in recent years.

Armenian 
In Armenia Karen is a common masculine given name.
 
The masculine given name Karen derived from the Parthian name of House of Karen (or Caren), one of the seven aristocratic families of ancient Iran. Several Iranian princes named Karen are known before and after the Islamic period. The Karen house ruled the Tabaristan region of Iran, which approximately corresponds to the current provinces of Gilan state and Mazandaran. 

The masculine given name Garen is a Western Armenian form of the Eastern Armenian Karen.

The masculine given name Karen was mentioned by the prominent Armenian historian Movses Khorenatsi (ca. 410–490s AD; Armenian: Մովսես Խորենացի) in his book History of Armenia.

Karen can also be a surname.

In East Asia
In East Asia, Karen is a feminine given name. The name can be found in Japan.

Notable people

First name

Surname
Anna Karen (1936–2022), South African British actress
James Karen (1923–2018), American actor
Tom Karen (1926–2022), Austrian-born British industrial designer

West Asian people

Armenian people
Karen Abrahamyan (born 1966), Armenian politician 
Karen Aghamyan (born 1946), Armenian painter
Karen Akopyan (born 1992), Russian former football player
Karen Aleksanyan (born 1980), Armenian football midfielder
Karen Andreasyan (born 1977), Armenian human rights defender
Karen Asatryan (born 1974), Armenian football player
Karen Asrian (1980–2008), Armenian chess grandmaster
Karen Demirchyan (1932–1999), Armenian politician
Karen Drambjan (1954–2011), Armenian-born Estonian lawyer, politician and activist
Karen Jalavyan (born 1971), Armenian Colonel in Artsakh
Karen Kavaleryan (born 1961), Russian musician and composer
Karen Khachanov (born 1996), Russian tennis player of Armenian descent
Karen Khachaturian (1920–2011), Russian composer of Armenian descent
Karen Sargsyan (conductor) (born 1952), Armenian choirmaster
Karen Shakhnazarov (born 1952), Russian filmmaker, producer and screenwriter of Armenian descent

Surname

Iranian people
Zarmihr Karen (died 558), Iranian nobleman and Sasanian governor of Zabulistan

East Asian people
Karen Iwata (born 1998), Japanese singer
Karen Makishima (born 1976), Japanese politician
Karen Miyama (born 1996), Japanese actress
Karen Mok (born 1970), Hong Kong singer and actress
Karen Nun-Ira (born 1991), Japanese judoka
Karen Tanaka (born 1961), Japanese composer
Karen Takizawa (born 1992), Japanese model, tarento and actress
Karen Yu (born 1980), Taiwanese politician

Fictional people

Live action

Animation

Print
Karen Starr, a character created by DC Comics, civilian identity of Power Girl

See also

 Caron (name)
 Garen (disambiguation)
Karan (given name)
Karan (surname)
Karien
Karen (slang)
Karey (disambiguation)

References

Armenian masculine given names
Danish feminine given names
Dutch feminine given names
English feminine given names
Finnish feminine given names
German feminine given names
Icelandic feminine given names
Irish feminine given names
Japanese feminine given names
Norwegian feminine given names
Scottish feminine given names
Swedish feminine given names